Urocoras munieri is a funnel weaver spider species found in Italy, Slovenia and Croatia.

See also 
 List of Agelenidae species

References

External links 

Agelenidae
Spiders of Europe
Spiders described in 1880